The Good, the Bad and the Ugly is a 1966 Italian film directed by Sergio Leone.

The Good, the Bad and the Ugly may also refer to:

 The Good, the Bad and the Ugly (1979 TV series), a Hong Kong TV series
Good Bad & Ugly, a Malayalm-language drama film directed by V. R. Rathish

Music
 The Good, the Bad and the Ugly (soundtrack), a 1966 soundtrack of the film
 "The Good, the Bad and the Ugly" (theme), the title theme of the film
 The Good, the Bad, the Ugly (Willie Colón album), 1975 album by Willie Colón with Héctor Lavoe
 The Good, the Bad, the Ugly (Frankee album), a 2004 album by Frankee
 Live: The Good, the Bad and the Ugly, a 1999 album by the Huntingtons